Roly Paniagua (born 14 November 1966) is a Bolivian footballer. He played in 25 matches for the Bolivia national football team from 1985 to 1996. He was also part of Bolivia's squad for the 1987 Copa América tournament.

References

External links
 

1966 births
Living people
Bolivian footballers
Bolivia international footballers
Association football forwards
Sportspeople from Santa Cruz de la Sierra
Club Blooming managers